Niksowizna  is a village in the administrative district of Gmina Kolno, within Kolno County, Podlaskie Voivodeship, in north-eastern Poland.

According to the 1921 census, the village was inhabited by 217 people, among whom 204 were Roman Catholic, 7 Evangelical, 6 Mosaic. At the same time, 211 inhabitants declared Polish nationality, and 6 Jewish. There were 47 residential buildings in the village.

The village has a population of 97.

References

Niksowizna